Michael Scott Doleac (born June 15, 1977) is an American former professional basketball player.

Doleac was selected 12th overall in the 1998 NBA draft by the Orlando Magic. He graduated from Central Catholic High School in Portland, Oregon in 1994 before going on to play college basketball at the University of Utah. As a senior at Utah, Doleac helped lead the team to the 1998 NCAA National Championship game, in which they lost to the University of Kentucky in Doleac's hometown of San Antonio, Texas. After four years at Utah, he established himself among the program's all-time greats, finishing in the Top 10 in career statistical 3 categories: 10th in scoring (1,519 points), 8th in rebounds (886) and 4th in free throws made (472).

In 1998, the Orlando Magic drafted Doleac with the 12th pick in the 1st round. As a rookie in 1999, Doleac was named to the NBA All-Rookie Second Team. In 2001, Doleac was traded from the Magic to the Cleveland Cavaliers for Brendan Haywood. Doleac later played for the New York Knicks (2002–2004), Denver Nuggets (2004), Miami Heat (2004–2007), and Minnesota Timberwolves (2007–2008). The highlight of his career was in 2005–2006, when he won an NBA title with the Miami Heat as the team's backup center behind the Hall of Famer, Shaquille O'Neal. 

Doleac retired after a 10-year NBA career after the 2007–2008 NBA season. He retired as a member of the Minnesota Timberwolves, who acquired him, along with Antoine Walker and Wayne Simien, in a deal that brought Mark Blount and Ricky Davis to the Heat.

After retirement, Doleac returned to the University of Utah initially planning to pursue a medical degree, but switched to studying for his masters in physics. In 2009, Doleac became a graduate manager for the University of Utah men's basketball team. 

Doleac had several songs created for him on ESPN's The Dan Le Batard Show with Stugotz.

Doleac taught physics, and coached the boys' varsity basketball team at Park City High School in Park City, Utah.

NBA career statistics

Regular season 

|-
| align="left" | 1998–99
| align="left" | Orlando
| 49 || 0 || 15.9 || .468 || .000 || .675 || 3.0 || .4 || .4 || .3 || 6.2
|-
| align="left" | 1999–00
| align="left" | Orlando
| 81 || 29 || 16.5 || .452 || .500 || .842 || 4.1 || .8 || .4 || .4 || 7.0
|-
| align="left" | 2000–01
| align="left" | Orlando
| 77 || 21 || 18.2 || .417 || .000 || .847 || 3.5 || .8 || .5 || .5 || 6.4
|-
| align="left" | 2001–02
| align="left" | Cleveland
| 42 || 15 || 16.8 || .417 || .000 || .826 || 4.0 || .6 || .4 || .3 || 4.6
|-
| align="left" | 2002–03
| align="left" | New York
| 75 || 0 || 13.9 || .426 || .000 || .783 || 2.9 || .6 || .2 || .2 || 4.4
|-
| align="left" | 2003–04
| align="left" | New York
| 46 || 0 || 14.9 || .444 || .000 || .861 || 4.1 || .7 || .4 || .6 || 5.0
|-
| align="left" | 2003–04
| align="left" | Denver
| 26 || 0 || 13.2 || .412 || .000 || .875 || 2.9 || .5 || .2 || .2 || 3.6
|-
| align="left" | 2004–05
| align="left" | Miami
| 80 || 8 || 14.7 || .447 || .000 || .610 || 3.2 || .6 || .3 || .3 || 4.0
|-
| style="text-align:left;background:#afe6ba;"| 2005–06†
| align="left" | Miami
| 31 || 3 || 12.0 || .420 || .000 || .800 || 2.7 || .3 || .3 || .2 || 3.2
|-
| align="left" | 2006–07
| align="left" | Miami
| 56 || 0 || 12.5 || .469 || .000 || .878 || 2.8 || .4 || .3 || .3 || 3.6
|-
| align="left" | 2007–08
| align="left" | Minnesota
| 24 || 8 || 10.7 || .444 || .000 || .500 || 2.0 || .3 || .4 || .4 || 2.4
|- class="sortbottom"
| style="text-align:center;" colspan="2"| Career
| 587 || 84 || 15.0 || .439 || .125 || .791 || 3.3 || .6 || .3 || .3 || 4.9

Playoffs 

|-
| align="left" | 1999
| align="left" | Orlando
| 4 || 0 || 10.8 || .278 || .000 || .778 || 3.0 || .0 || .0 || .2 || 4.3
|-
| align="left" | 2001
| align="left" | Orlando
| 4 || 0 || 11.3 || .375 || .000 || .000 || 3.5 || .3 || .8 || .0 || 3.0
|-
| align="left" | 2004
| align="left" | Denver
| 5 || 0 || 9.8 || .500 || .000 || .000 || 1.4 || .6 || .0 || .0 || 2.0
|-
| align="left" | 2005
| align="left" | Miami
| 9 || 0 || 7.2 || .438 || .000 || 1.000 || 1.6 || .0 || .1 || .1 || 1.8
|-
| style="text-align:left;background:#afe6ba;"| 2006†
| align="left" | Miami
| 8 || 0 || 9.0 || .538 || .000 || 1.000 || 2.8 || .0 || .1 || .0 || 2.0
|-
| align="left" | 2007
| align="left" | Miami
| 1 || 0 || 1.0 || .000 || .000 || .000 || .0 || .0 || .0 || .0 || .0
|- class="sortbottom"
| style="text-align:center;" colspan="2"| Career
| 31 || 0 || 8.9 || .411 || .000 || .846 || 2.2 || .1 || .2 || .1 || 2.3

Notes

External links
NBA.com Profile – Michael Doleac

1977 births
Living people
American men's basketball players
Basketball players from San Antonio
Centers (basketball)
Central Catholic High School (Portland, Oregon) alumni
Cleveland Cavaliers players
Denver Nuggets players
Miami Heat players
Minnesota Timberwolves players
New York Knicks players
Orlando Magic draft picks
Orlando Magic players
Basketball players from Portland, Oregon
Sportspeople from Portland, Oregon
Sportspeople from San Antonio
Utah Utes men's basketball coaches
Utah Utes men's basketball players